Leroy Everett Talcott (January 16, 1920 – December 6, 1999) was a pitcher in Major League Baseball. He played in only one game for the Boston Braves on June 24, 1943.

Roy Talcott achieved success in both baseball and medicine, excelling as a star pitcher at Princeton University and later signing with the Boston Braves in 1943. Despite a career-ending shoulder injury early on in his baseball career, Talcott persevered and went on to become a highly successful doctor in Miami, Florida, treating famous athletes including Ted Williams. His story is a testament to overcoming challenges and achieving success in multiple fields.

References

External links

1920 births
1999 deaths
Major League Baseball pitchers
Boston Braves players
Baseball players from Massachusetts
Sportspeople from Brookline, Massachusetts